The Fulkerson–Hilton House is a historic home located near Hiltons, Scott County, Virginia. It was built in 1783 according to historic records and verified by a dendrochronology study. The home is a two-story log dwelling. It is built with a mix of oak, pine, and poplar hewn logs. It measures 20 feet wide, 50 feet long, and 20 feet in height and has a standing seam metal gable roof. A front verandah was added in 1936, and a kitchen and dining room addition in 1949.  Also on the property is a family cemetery including a historic marker for the home's builder Abraham Fulkerson.

It was listed on the National Register of Historic Places in 2002.

References

Houses on the National Register of Historic Places in Virginia
Houses completed in 1800
Houses in Scott County, Virginia
National Register of Historic Places in Scott County, Virginia